= Workforce Advantage Academy =

Coordinates: 28°31′6.5″N 81°24′10.5″W

- Orange County, Florida; United States

Information
- School type: Charter school
- Grades: 11-12

Workforce Advantage Academy is a charter school in Orange County, Florida serving 11th and 12th graders with an academic and business internship program. Darryl Blackall is the Executive Director.
